Alessandro Carrilho Camarço (born 25 April 1982) is a Brazilian former professional tennis player.

Camarço, who comes from the state of Goiás, reached a best singles world ranking of 382 and won four ITF Futures titles. In 2004 he was called into the Brazil Davis Cup team for a tie against Peru in Brasília, following a boycott by the first choice players. He featured in a singles rubber and was beaten in three sets by Matías Silva.

ITF Futures finals

Singles: 5 (4–1)

Doubles: 2 (0–2)

See also
List of Brazil Davis Cup team representatives

References

External links
 
 
 

1982 births
Living people
Brazilian male tennis players
Sportspeople from Goiás
21st-century Brazilian people